The Bells is a 1911 Australian feature-length silent film directed by W. J. Lincoln. It is based on the famous stage melodrama by Erckmann-Chatrian, adapted by Leopold Lewis, which in turn had been adapted for the Australian stage by W. J. Lincoln before he made it into a film.

It is today considered a lost film.

It was one of several films Lincoln made with the Tait family, who had produced The Story of the Kelly Gang. According to Lincoln's obituary in The Bulletin it was one of Lincoln's best films.

Plot
Mathias (Arthur Styan) is an innkeeper in a village in Alsace, happily married to Catherine (Miss Grist) and with a daughter Annette (Nellie Bramley). However he is greatly in debt, so on Christmas Day 1833, he murders a Polish Jew (Mr Cullenane) who visits the inn for his gold. He uses this to pay off his debts and rise in society, becoming the burgomaster of the town – however he is always tormented by guilt.

Fifteen years later on Christmas Day, Mathias becomes delirious and hears the sound of the Jew's sleigh bells. He dreams he is being tried for the murder and is found guilty. He awakes and dies, leaving his family none the wiser.

Cast

Production
The film was an adaptation of a well known play and featured the only known screen appearance of stage actor Nellie Bramley. It was shot partly on location of Mount Donna Buang in Victoria.

Sam Crews was the scenic artist, and John Ennis was the stage manager. Stage scenery was hired from J.C. Williamson Ltd. It was shot at a studio in St Kilda.

Release
Screenings of the film were often accompanied by a lectured from J Ennis, who was in the film.

The film was released in the US in 1914 by Sawyers Inc.

See also
 The Bells (US 1918)
 The Bells (US 1926)
 The Bells (UK 1931)
 The Burgomeister (Australia 1935)

References

External links
 
The Bells at AustLit
 The Bells at National Film and Sound Archive
Full text of the play

Australian black-and-white films
Australian silent feature films
1911 films
Lost Australian films
Australian drama films
1911 drama films
Melodrama films
Films directed by W. J. Lincoln
Silent drama films